Leštiny is a village and municipality in Dolný Kubín District in the Žilina Region of northern Slovakia.

The village contains an Evangelical wooden church constructed in 1688-89 by local carpenters.

History
In historical records the village was first mentioned in 1381.

Geography
The municipality lies at an altitude of 586 metres and covers an area of 6.939 km². It has a population of about 225 people.

References

Villages and municipalities in Dolný Kubín District